'Suramani' Pandit Raghunath Panigrahi (10 August 1932 – 25 August 2013) was an Odissi music Guru, vocalist, composer and music director. He is most known for his renditions of Jayadeva's Gita Govinda and his vocal support for his wife, the Odissi danseuse Sanjukta Panigrahi. Raghunath belonged to a family associated with Odissi music for centuries, members of which were 19th-century Odissi poet-composer Sadhaka Kabi Gourahari Parichha and Gayaka Siromani Apanna Panigrahi who was the royal musician (raja-sangitagya) of Paralakhemundi. He started his musical training from his father Pt Neelamani Panigrahi, who had been collecting traditional Odissi melodies of the Gita Govinda from the Jagannatha Temple of Puri. Later, Raghunath continued learning Odissi music under Pt Narasingha Nandasarma and Pt Biswanatha Das. He was widely known as 'Gitagobinda Panigrahi'.

He also sang in popular Odia, Kannada, Tamil and Telugu movies. Raghunath left a promising career in film music in Chennai to provide vocal support to his wife, Sanjukta Panigrahi, a legendary Odissi performer and composer. He made a lifetime contribution of promoting, propagating and popularizing the life and works of Jayadeva and the cult of Lord Jagannatha. Sanjukta-Raghunath played for many years from the 1960s until the 1990s.

After the death of Sanjukta in 1997, he was associated with the Nrityagram and gave music for many of their productions. He formed the 'Sanjukta Panigrahi Memorial Trust', in 1999, to promote the cause of Odishi dance.  Since 2001, every year on her birth anniversary, the trust has been giving away scholarships to budding dancers, and awards excellence in the field of Orissi dance.

Personal life
Raghunath Panigrahi was born on 10 August 1932 in Gunupur, Rayagada, Odisha. He started his musical training first under his father, Sri Nilamani Panigrahi, who later put him under the tutelage of Odissi music exponent Pt Narasingha Nandasarma of Puri. He met his future wife dancer Padma Shri Sanjukta Panigrahi at Kalakshetra dance school, subsequently they married in 1960 and had two sons. He died on 25 August 2013 in Bhubaneswar at the age of 82.

Filmography

Awards
 Title of Sur Mani 1968
 He received an award from the government of France in the 1980s.
 Sangeet Natak Akademi Award,1976
 State Sangeet Natak Akademi Award, 1993
 Padma Shri, 2010
 Sangeet Natak Akademi Fellowship
 Jayadeva Samman- 2008
 Lifetime Achievement award of Banichitra Awards, 2008
 Degree, Doctor of Literature, Ravenshaw University, Odisha, August 2013
 Degree, Doctor of Literature, Utkal University, Odisha, 2011
 Degree, Doctor of Literature, Berhampur University, Odisha, 2010

References

External links
 
  - A song by R. Panigrahi in Tamil from Aval Yaar

1932 births
2013 deaths
Recipients of the Padma Shri in arts
20th-century Indian male classical singers
Odissi
Indian male playback singers
Recipients of the Sangeet Natak Akademi Award
People from Rayagada district
Indian classical composers
Bollywood playback singers
Singers from Odisha

Odissi music
Recipients of the Odisha Sangeet Natak Akademi award